Zhongshan Park is a public urban park in Nanshan, Shenzhen, China. Built in 1925 and subsequently named after Sun Yat-Sen (also known as Sūn Zhōngshān), the first president of the Republic of China, it is the oldest surviving park in Shenzhen. 

A section of the northern city walls of Nantou dating back to 1394, are preserved within the park. The park was renovated and reopened to the public in 1999. It also features a carving of Sun Yat-Sen, the largest of its kind in the country.

See also
List of parks in Shenzhen

References

Nanshan District, Shenzhen
Parks in Shenzhen
Sun Yat-sen